Kamnje is a settlement on the right bank of the Sava Bohinjka River in the Municipality of Bohinj in the Upper Carniola region of Slovenia.

References

External links 

Kamnje at Geopedia

Populated places in the Municipality of Bohinj